Bendon is an American publisher of children's books.

History
In 2007, Kappa Books acquired a minority stake in Bendon. 

In 2012, The Wicks Group purchased the majority stake in Bendon. 

In 2013, Bendon had acquired Dalmatian Press. 

In 2014, Bendon acquired Artistic Studios. 

In 2015, Irving Place Capital acquired Bendon from The Wicks Group. 

In 2017, Bendon and kathy ireland Worldwide extended their partnership. 

In May 2019, Bendon partnered with Devar to make a series of four My Little Pony-branded, AR-enhanced coloring and activity books.

References

External links

2001 establishments in the United States

Book publishing companies based in Ohio